Bajra is a town in Faisalabad District of Punjab in Pakistan.

External links
 "Bajra Map — Satellite Images of Bajra" Maplandia World Gazetteer

Cities and towns in Faisalabad District